Below are the names and numbers of the steam locomotives that comprised the LB&SCR B1 class, that ran on the London, Brighton and South Coast Railway, and latterly the Southern Railway network. The class names mainly relate to politicians and railway officials, or places served by the LB&SCR. All 36 locomotives were built at Brighton Works.

References

Information not otherwise credited has been obtained from the LBSC website.

B1list
0-4-2 locomotives
LbandScr B1 Class Locomotives
LbandScr B1 Class Locomotives